Puerto Rico Airport is a public airport serving Puerto Rico, in the Pando Department of Bolivia. The western end of the runway doubles as a street in the town.

See also

Transport in Bolivia
List of airports in Bolivia

References

External links 
OpenStreetMap - Puerto Rico
OurAirports - Puerto Rico
FallingRain - Puerto Rico Airport

Airports in Pando Department